Chief Kolapo Olawuyi Ishola (6 June 1934 – 9 August 2011) was a Nigerian politician who was elected on the Social Democratic Party (SDP) platform as Governor of Oyo State, Nigeria, holding office between January 1992 and November 1993 during the Nigerian Third Republic.

Ishola started work as a Survey Assistant in the Ministry of Lands, (1956–1959), then as Building Inspector with the Ibadan Municipal Government (1959–1960). He also worked as Land Surveyor with the Federal government. He studied in London and became an associate of the Royal Institution of Chartered Surveyors. In 1969 he was awarded the Nigerian Surveyors Licence Certificate.

Ishola was elected on the Social Democratic Party (SDP) platform as Governor of Oyo State in December 1991, taking office on 2 January 1992.
On 3 September 1992 Ishola formally established the Oyo state post-primary schools teaching service commission.
He founded the School of Science in the year 1992 which is now one of the best science school in Nigeria, Pade, which was abandoned by the subsequent military government.
Ishola left office on 17 November 1993 when General Sani Abacha assumed power.

Kolapo Olawuyi Ishola died in his sleep in the early hours of Tuesday, 9 August 2011 in Ibadan, South West Nigeria, aged 77.

References

1934 births
2011 deaths
Social Democratic Party (Nigeria) politicians
Governors of Oyo State